Henri Lubin Adelphe Chasles (5 October 1795 – 28 January 1868) was a 19th-century French politician.

Biography 
The brother of mathematician Michel Chasles, he was a notary in Paris during the Bourbon restoration.

Mayor of Chartres from 27 August 1830 to 10 December 1847, president of the departmental council and MP for Eure-et-Loir from 1831 to 1848, he was part of the majority supporting the ministries of the July Monarchy.

As mayor of Chartres he was responsible for the creation of the district of Petits-Blés, the demolishing of fortifications and bridging the gap that stretched from place Saint-Michel to that of the Épars. The creation of Boulevard Chasles (formerly Boulevard Saint-Michel) and rue Mathurin Régnier. The destruction of the walls between the gate of Chatelet and that of Saint-Jean, the creation of the Savings Bank of the city, the slaughterhouses of Saint-Brice, a shelter hall and the lighting by gas of the city.

Chasles was made chevalier of the Légion d'honneur in 1844 ;

Sources

References

External links 
  Henri Lubin Adelphe Chasles on Sycomore
  Henri Lubin Adolphe Chasles on Base Léonore

1795 births
1868 deaths
Politicians from Chartres
Orléanists
Members of the 2nd Chamber of Deputies of the July Monarchy
Members of the 3rd Chamber of Deputies of the July Monarchy
Members of the 4th Chamber of Deputies of the July Monarchy
Members of the 5th Chamber of Deputies of the July Monarchy
Members of the 6th Chamber of Deputies of the July Monarchy
Members of the 7th Chamber of Deputies of the July Monarchy
Chevaliers of the Légion d'honneur